Associação Joaçaba Esporte e Cultura, is a Brazilian futsal club from Joaçaba. The team currently plays in Liga Futsal.

Current squad

References

External links
 Joaçaba official website
 Joaçaba LNF profile
 Joaçaba in zerozero.pt

Futsal clubs established in 2001
Futsal clubs in Brazil
Sports teams in Santa Catarina (state)
2001 establishments in Brazil